Contraband is the debut studio album by American hard rock band Velvet Revolver, released on June 8, 2004, by RCA Records. A commercial success, Contraband debuted at number one on the American Billboard 200 chart and was certified double platinum by the RIAA.

Background and recording

Velvet Revolver formed when Guns N' Roses musicians Slash (guitar), Duff McKagan (bass) and Matt Sorum (drums) combined to play at a benefit concert for fellow musician Randy Castillo in 2002. They decided to form a band and recruited guitarist Dave Kushner who had previously played with Suicidal Tendencies, Wasted Youth, and Dave Navarro. The quartet then set about recruiting a lead singer with the recruitment process filmed by VH1. Several lead singers auditioned including Josh Todd of Buckcherry, Kelly Shaefer of Neurotica and Travis Meeks of Days of the New. Scott Weiland had become friends with McKagan and had played on the same bill as Kushner when Stone Temple Pilots were known as Mighty Joe Young and Kushner was in the Electric Love Hogs. Weiland heard the material and offered his services as the lead singer and the band clicked. Slash suggested the name Revolver for the project while Weiland suggested Black Velvet Revolver which was shortened to Velvet Revolver.

Velvet Revolver recorded its first track "Set Me Free" for The Hulk soundtrack in 2003, along with a cover of Pink Floyd's "Money" for The Italian Job. The band played their first live gig at the El Rey in Los Angeles in July 2003. It recorded Contraband in the latter part of 2003 with recording complicated by Weiland's court appearances for drug charges and his subsequent sentencing to undertake rehabilitation.

In February 2005, RCA Records released a "Tour Edition" of the album in Europe, which included a bonus disc containing three songs: "Surrender" (originally by Cheap Trick), "No More, No More" (originally by Aerosmith), and an acoustic version of "Fall to Pieces".

The United States release of the disc uses the MediaMax CD-3 system for copy protection, while Macrovision CDS-200 is used for the European release.

The album cover features a silhouette of American actress Rena Riffel.

Scott Borchetta named his record label Big Machine Records after the Contraband song of the same name.

Slash recorded "Sucker Train Blues" with a Fender Telecaster 1956 and a Fender Stratocaster 1965.

Critical reception

Metacritic.com has given Contraband an average score of 65 based on 14 reviews, indicating that the critical response has been "generally favorable".

Mojo rated the album as "a perpetually guilty pleasure." Q magazine said it was "astonishingly good" rating it as four stars.

Rolling Stone rated it as four stars out of five and said, "it is a rare, fine thing: the sound of the perfect A&R sales pitch turning into a real band. Now we can find out if these guys can stay together, and go somewhere new."

ShakingThrough.net rated it as three and a half stars, although it said, "Contraband, the debut result of said pairing, never does transmute its elements into something new and exciting. Mostly, it sounds like no more and a little less than one might hope for from such a union."

Entertainment Weekly gave it a B−, saying, "[E]ven at its sharpest, Contraband feels secondhand, and much of it is also hobbled by a disconnect between singer and band."

Allmusic rated it as three stars out of five, saying, "With Contraband, Velvet Revolver has pulled off something tidy, fashioning music that manages both hedonism and maturity. It upholds legacies while grading a new route." Best tracks: "Big Machine", "Fall to Pieces" "Slither"

Blender said it was "A showcase for Weiland's vocals". Playlouder rated it as three candles out of five saying it sounded more like Stone Temple Pilots and "anyone who'd hoped for Guns N' Roses mark II (or III) will be very seriously disappointed." Best track "Fall to Pieces"

In 2005, Contraband was ranked number 317 in Rock Hard magazine's book The 500 Greatest Rock & Metal Albums of All Time.

Commercial performance
Contraband debuted at No. 1 on the Billboard 200, selling 256,000 copies in its first week of release. Notably, this marked the best-ever debut for a new rock artist in the SoundScan era. The album would eventually sell over 2.9 million copies in the United States, and 4 million worldwide.

The first single, "Slither", topped a composite world modern rock chart in June, and later hit No. 1 on the Billboard Mainstream Rock Chart for 8 weeks. The follow-up, "Fall to Pieces", was a major crossover hit that reached No. 1 on the Billboard Mainstream Rock Chart for 11 weeks.

In 2005, Velvet Revolver won the Grammy Award for Best Hard Rock Performance, an award Weiland had previously won for the Stone Temple Pilots song "Plush" in 1994. At the ceremony, they were asked to play the music for a cover of The Beatles' "Across the Universe". The live recording was a hit on iTunes, with all proceeds going to charity. In January 2005, Velvet Revolver were also asked to play the music for a cover of Eric Clapton's "Tears in Heaven". The single was to aid victims of the 2004 Indian Ocean earthquake, with all proceeds going to Save the Children Foundation.

Track listing

Note
The version of "Set Me Free" on the album is different from the version on The Hulk soundtrack with different mixing and also contains a slightly different ending.

Personnel
Adapted from the album's booklet.

Velvet Revolver
Scott Weiland – lead vocals
Slash – lead guitar, backing vocals
Duff McKagan – bass, backing vocals
Matt Sorum – drums, backing vocals
Dave Kushner – rhythm guitar

Design
Robin C. Hendrickson – art direction
Brett Kilroe – art direction
Dan Winters – photography

Production
Josh Abraham – production
Douglas Grean –  keyboards on tracks 6, 10 and 13, vocal production, engineering, associate producer of "Set Me Free"
Nick Raskulinecz – production on "Set Me Free"
Andy Wallace – mixing
Chris Young – mixing assistance
Ryan Williams – engineering
Brandon Belsky – engineering assistance
Rocco Guarino – engineering assistance
George Marino – mastering

Charts

Weekly charts

Year-end charts

Singles - Billboard (North America)

Certifications

References

2004 debut albums
Velvet Revolver albums
Albums produced by Josh Abraham
Albums produced by Nick Raskulinecz
RCA Records albums